Armando González (8 August 1931 – 7 December 2022) was a Spanish coxswain. He competed in the men's coxed four event at the 1960 Summer Olympics.

References

External links
 

1931 births
2022 deaths
Spanish male rowers
Olympic rowers of Spain
Rowers at the 1960 Summer Olympics
Sportspeople from Vigo
Coxswains (rowing)